Žarko is a South Slavic male given name used in former Yugoslavia. It originated in Serbia and is used predominantly by ethnic Serbs. It may refer to:

Žarko (nobleman), a 14th-century Serbian nobleman
Žarko Paspalj, Yugoslav/Serbian basketballer
Žarko Obradović, Serbian politician
Žarko Čabarkapa, Serbian retired basketballer
Žarko Korać, Serbian psychologist and politician
Žarko Lazetić, Serbian retired footballer
Žarko Petan, Slovenian writer, essayist, screenwriter, and theatre and film director
Žarko Varajić, retired Yugoslav basketballer
Žarko Odžakov, retired Yugoslav and Australian footballer
Žarko Olarević
Žarko Laušević
Žarko Marković (footballer) (born 1987), Serbian footballer
Žarko Marković (handballer) (born 1986), Montenegrin-Qatari handball player
Žarko Tomašević
Žarko Đurović
Žarko Potočnjak
Žarko Bulajić
Žarko Zečević
Žarko Nikolić
Žarko Dolinar
Žarko Petrović
Žarko Zrenjanin
Žarko Serafimovski
Žarko Grabovač
Žarko Domljan
Žarko Vekić
Žarko Puhovski
Žarko Drašković
Žarko Belada
Žarko Kisić
Žarko Korać (footballer)
Zarko Kujundziski

See also
Žarković
Žarkić
Žarkovac (disambiguation)
Žarkovo
Žarkovina

Slavic masculine given names
Serbian masculine given names